André Foucher was a French modern pentathlete. He competed at the 1920 Summer Olympics.

References

External links
 

Year of birth unknown
Year of death unknown
French male modern pentathletes
Olympic modern pentathletes of France
Modern pentathletes at the 1920 Summer Olympics